Abkhori (also Romanized as Abkhoran'also known as Āb-i-Kūri, Ābkhowrī, Ābkhvorī, and Āb Kūrī) is a village in Howmeh Rural District, in the Central District of Semnan County, Semnan Province, Iran. At the 2006 census, its population was 46, in 19 families.

References 

Populated places in Semnan County